Great Britain women's national goalball team is the women's national team of Great Britain.  Goalball is a team sport designed specifically for athletes with a vision impairment.  It takes part in international goalball competitions.

Paralympic Games

1988 Seoul 

The team competed in the 1988 Summer Paralympics, from 15 to 24 October 1988, in Seoul, South Korea.  The team finished eighth.

2000 Sydney 

The team competed in the 2000 Summer Paralympics, between 18 and 29 October 2000, at an Olympic Park indoor hall,  Sydney, New South Wales, Australia.  They finished fifth.

2012 London 

As the host nation, the team competed in the 2012 Summer Paralympics from 30 August to 7 September 2012, in the Copper Box Arena, London, England.  In Group A, they came second behind China, and went onto the quarter-finals, to lose to Sweden, 1:2.

Athletes were Georgina Bullen, Jessica Luke, Amy Ottaway, Anna Sharkey, and Louise Simpson.

Quarter-finals

2020 Tokyo 

Great Britain placed fourth in the October 2019 Regional Championships at Rostock, which was not sufficient to get a Paralympic berth.  However they had attended the July 2019 Fort Wayne qualifying tournament, where they placed sixth.  When all 2020 Summer Paralympics goalball slots assigned for Tokyo were filled, this left the team as the next available team from the ranking tournament.

Under regulation 47.4.5 of the goalball rules, 'After all Pre-Paralympic Qualification Tournaments are completed, the remaining Paralympic Games qualification slots will be filled using the results from the IBSA Paralympic Goalball Ranking Tournament, selecting teams in the order of finish'.  The IBSA Africa regional championship at Port Said in March 2020 did not have the required number of participating teams to constitute a regional championship under regulation 47 (in part, 'Tournaments must have a minimum of four participating countries to qualify as a regional championship tournament...').  However IBSA accepted the Algeria women's national goalball team to the slot.  In April 2021 on the eve of the competition group draw, Algeria withdrew without a reason, and several days later, the International Paralympic Committee announced Egypt had received the slot, 'following its redistribution by the International Paralympic Committee (IPC) according to the Tokyo 2020 Paralympic Games Qualification Regulations'.

Within days, Goalball UK had sought legal advice regarding this action, the chief executive officer stating:
For almost two years, we have had assurances that as first reserve for a place at Tokyo 2020 it could realistically present an opportunity for our women’s Great Britain squad to compete at the Paralympics if there was a withdrawal from the tournament. ... Unfortunately, it has now become apparent that this was never the case despite Great Britain's ranking.

World Championships

1986 Roermond 

The 1986 IBSA World Goalball Championships were held in Roermond, the Netherlands.  The team was one of ten teams participating, and they finished seventh overall.

1998 Madrid 

The team competed in the 1998 World Championships, in Madrid, Spain.  The team was one of eleven teams participating, and they finished fourth overall.

2010 Sheffield 

As the host nation, and in the lead-up to the 2012 London Paralympic Games, the team competed in the 2010 World Championships, from 20 to 25 June 2010, in Sheffield, England.  In Pool Y, they lost to China 0:0, Finland 0:7, Russia 2:3, Japan 1:2, but beat Denmark 1:0.

2022 Matosinhos 

The team competed in the 2022 World Championships from 7 to 16 December 2022, at the Centro de Desportos e Congressos de Matosinhos, Portugal.  There were sixteen men's and sixteen women's teams.  They placed fourth in Pool B, and seventh in final standings.

IBSA World Games

2007 São Paulo 

The team competed in the 2003 IBSA World Games, from 28 July 2007 to 8 August 2007, in São Paulo, Brazil.  The women's goalball competition included thirteen teams, including this one.  The competition was a 2008 Summer Paralympics qualifying event.  Maria Tzalla was ninth in the competition in scoring with 12 points.

2015 Seoul  

The team competed in the 2015 IBSA World Games from 10 to 17 May 2015, in Seoul, South Korea.  They placed fifth of the eight teams.

Regional championships 

The team competes in the IBSA Europe goalball region.  Groups A and C are held one year, and Group B the following year.  Strong teams move towards Group A.

2005 Neerpelt  

The team competed in the 2015 IBSA European Regional Championships, from 15 to 23 October 2005, in Neerpelt and Overpelt, Belgium.  Organised by the Vlaamse Liga Gehandicaptensport vzw (Flemish Sport Federation for Persons with a Disability), it hosted the men's Groups A and B (Belgium, Czech Republic, Denmark, Finland, Germany, Great Britain, Hungary, Italy, Lithuania, Slovakia, Slovenia, Spain, Sweden, and Ukraine), and the women division (Belarus, Denmark, Finland, Germany, Great Britain, Greece, Netherlands, Spain, Sweden, and Ukraine).  Games were held in the Provinciaal Domein Dommelhof Sport in Neerpelt, and Sportcentrum De Bemvoort in Overpelt.  With ten teams competing, the team finished ninth.

2007 Antalya  

The team competed at the 2007 IBSA Goalball European Championships, hosted by the Turkish Blind Sports Federation, in Antalya, Turkey with 11 teams contesting the women's competition. The team finished ninth.

2009 Munich (Group A) 

The team competed at the 2009 European Championships, in Munich, Germany, with eleven teams taking part.  The team finished the event in first place.

2013 Konya (Group A)  

The team competed in the 2013 IBSA Goalball European Championships, Group A, from 1 to 11 November 2013, at Konya, Turkey.  They finished eighth.

2017 Pajulahti (Group A) 

The team competed in the 2017 IBSA Goalball European A Championships from 15 to 23 September 2017, at Pajulahti, Nastola, Finland.  Coming third in Pool X, they lost to Greece in the quarter-finals, 0:1.  They beat Germany 5:3 for placement, and finished sixth overall.

Athletes included Georgina Bullen, Laura Perry, and Anna Tipton.

2019 Rostock (Group A) 

The team competed in the 2019 IBSA Goalball European A Championships from 5 to 14 October 2019, in Rostock, Germany.  They placed second in the final standings.  They placed fourth, behind Germany, Israel and winners Turkey.

Athletes were Georgina Bullen, Antonia Bunyan, Sarah Leiter, Kali Holder, Meme Robertson, and Lois Turner.  Coaches were Aaron Ford and Becky Ashworth, and staff Jim Wallis.

Competitive history 
The table below contains individual game results for the team in international matches and competitions.

Goal scoring by competition

See also 

 Disabled sports
 Great Britain men's national goalball team
 Great Britain women's junior national goalball team
 Great Britain at the Paralympics

References

Goalball women's
National women's goalball teams
Great Britain at the Paralympics
Goalball in the United Kingdom
European national goalball teams